Pryberezhne is a village located in Saky Raion, Crimea. Population:

See also
Saky Raion

References

Villages in Crimea
Saky Raion